

The Caudron C.450 and C.460   were French racing aircraft built to participate in the Coupe Deutsch de la Meurthe race of 1934.

Design
Developed from the Caudron C.362 flown in the previous year's race, a single C.450 and three C.460s were built for the 1934 event.  All were powered by a supercharged Renault 456 six-cylinder inverted air-cooled engine driving a Ratier two-position variable-pitch propeller.  The airframe was primarily built from spruce and birch plywood, with steel and alloy engine bearers and magnesium cowling and fuel tanks.  The wings were fitted with split flaps and the angle of incidence of the tailplane could be varied while in flight.  The principal difference between the types was that the C.450 had a fixed spatted undercarriage, while the C.460 had a retractable undercarriage.  This difference resulted in structural differences, the retractable undercarriage necessitating a two-spar wing for the C.460 in contrast to the single-spar wing used by the C.450.

For the 1936 Coupe de la Meurthe competition Caudron built two examples of a development of the C.460, the C.461.

Service history
In the 1934 Coupe de la Meurthe the C.450 took first place, piloted by Maurice Arnoux, and one of the C.460s took third, piloted by Albert Monville.  The C.460s had been handicapped by problems with the retractable undercarriage, which resulted in them flying with the undercarriage fixed in the down position during the contest.

A C.460 won the Coupe Deutsch de la Meurthe in 1935,  piloted by Delmotte, with an average speed of 443.96 km/h (277.5 mph).

In 1936, a C.460, piloted by Michel Detroyat, also won the Greve Trophy and Thompson Trophy at the 1936 National Air Races in the United States.

The 1936 Coupe Deutsch de la Meurthe was won by Yves Lacombe flying the C.450.

In January 2009 a Fairchild Ranger-powered replica of the C.460 was built by a team including Tom Wathen, Mark Lightsey, Aerocraftsman Inc. and students of the Wathen Aviation High School. The aircraft was displayed at the Paris Air Show in 2009.

Variants
C.450  (one built)
C.460  (three built)
C.461  (two built)

Specifications (C.460)

References

Bibliography

 

Racing aircraft
1930s French sport aircraft
C.460
Single-engined tractor aircraft
Low-wing aircraft
Aircraft first flown in 1934